Matthias Donath (born in 1975) is a German art historian and author.

He appears as an expert discussing the Pergamon Altar in the second season of the television show Museum Secrets.

References

External links
 Personal website

German art historians
1975 births
Living people